The Man with the Golden Gun is the twelfth and final novel in Ian Fleming's James Bond series and thirteenth Bond book overall. It was first published by Jonathan Cape in the UK on 1 April 1965, eight months after the author's death. The novel was not as detailed or polished as the others in the series, leading to poor but polite reviews. Despite that, the book was a best-seller.

The story centres on the fictional British Secret Service operative James Bond, who had been posted missing, presumed dead, after his last mission in Japan. Bond returns to Britain via the Soviet Union, where he had been brainwashed to attempt to assassinate his superior, M. After being "cured" by the MI6 doctors, Bond is sent to the Caribbean to find and kill Francisco Scaramanga, the titular "Man with the Golden Gun".

The first draft and part of the editing process was completed before Fleming's death and the manuscript had passed through the hands of his copy editor, William Plomer, but it was not as polished as other Bond stories. Much of the detail contained in the previous novels was missing, as this was often added by Fleming in the second draft. Publishers Jonathan Cape passed the manuscript to Kingsley Amis for his thoughts and advice on the story, although his suggestions were not used.

The novel was serialised in 1965, firstly in the Daily Express and then in Playboy; in 1966 a daily comic strip adaptation was also published in the Daily Express. In 1974 the book was loosely adapted as the ninth film in the Eon Productions James Bond series, with Roger Moore playing Bond and Fleming's cousin, Christopher Lee, as Scaramanga.

Plot
Almost a year after James Bond's final confrontation with Ernst Stavro Blofeld during a mission in Japan, a man claiming to be Bond appears in London and demands to meet the head of the Secret Service, M. Bond's identity is confirmed, but during his debriefing interview with M, Bond tries to kill him with a cyanide pistol; the attempt fails as M releases a bullet proof glass shield above his desk in the nick of time. The Service learns that after destroying Blofeld's castle in Japan, Bond suffered a head injury and developed amnesia. Having lived as a Japanese fisherman for several months, Bond travelled into the Soviet Union to learn his true identity. While there, he was brainwashed and assigned to kill M upon returning to England.

Now de-programmed, Bond is given a chance to again prove his worth as a member of the 00 section following the assassination attempt. M sends Bond to Jamaica and gives him the seemingly impossible mission of killing Francisco "Pistols" Scaramanga, a Cuban assassin who is believed to have killed several British secret agents. Scaramanga is known as "The Man with the Golden Gun" because his weapon of choice is a gold-plated Colt .45 revolver, which fires silver-jacketed solid-gold bullets.

Bond locates Scaramanga in a Jamaican bordello and manages to become his temporary personal assistant under the name "Mark Hazard". He learns that Scaramanga is involved in a hotel development on the island with a group of investors that consists of a syndicate of American gangsters and the KGB. Scaramanga and the other investors are also engaged in a scheme to destabilise Western interests in the Caribbean's sugar industry and increase the value of the Cuban sugar crop, running drugs into America, smuggling prostitutes from Mexico into America and operating casinos in Jamaica that will cause friction between tourists and the local people.

Bond discovers that he has an ally who is also working undercover at the half-built resort, Felix Leiter, who has been recalled to duty by the CIA and is working ostensibly as an electrical engineer while setting up bugs in Scaramanga's meeting room. However, they learn that Scaramanga plans to eliminate Bond when the weekend is over. Bond's true identity is confirmed by a KGB agent and Scaramanga makes new plans to entertain the gangsters and the KGB agent by killing Bond while they are riding a sight-seeing train to a marina. However, Bond manages to turn the tables on Scaramanga and, with the help of Leiter, kill most of the conspirators. Wounded, Scaramanga escapes into the swamps, where Bond pursues him. Scaramanga lulls Bond off-guard by appealing to his British sense of morality by not killing in cold blood and allowing him to recite a final prayer, and shoots him with a golden derringer hidden in his palm loaded with a bullet laced with enough snake venom to kill a horse. Bond is hit but returns fire and shoots Scaramanga five times, killing him at last before collapsing into unconsciousness.

Characters and themes
The central character of the novel is James Bond. In The Man with the Golden Gun, he appears with a different personality from the previous stories and is robot-like, according to author of the "continuation" Bond novels, Raymond Benson. Benson also felt that Bond's character had not been developed any further than in the previous books. Academic Jeremy Black noted that when given two opportunities to kill Scaramanga in cold blood, he cannot bring himself to do it. The first time this happens, Bond sits in a car behind Scaramanga; the method of killing would be to shoot him in the back of the head and this is compared to the technique used by both the KGB and Nazis. According to Black, Bond has to rise above the actions and act more suitably for a British fictional hero. Once the mission is completed, Bond is offered the KCMG, but he refuses the honour and reflects on his own name, "a quiet, dull, anonymous name", which had been Fleming's aim when he first named the character. Benson also points out that the touches of humour displayed by Bond in the previous novels disappeared and he appeared in the book as cold and emotionless.

For the first time in the Bond canon, M's full name of "Admiral Sir Miles Messervy KCMG" was finally revealed. Despite being the target of the failed assassination attempt, not only does M not press charges against Bond, he sends him out on further missions.

According to Benson, the main adversary of the novel, Francisco Scaramanga, is more a henchman than a major adversary and "a second-rate, smalltime crook who happens to have gotten lucky with his shooting." Comentale, Watt and Willman note that Scaramanga had the same character profile as Herr von Hammerstein, the former Gestapo officer who is the chief of counterintelligence for the Cuban secret service in
"For Your Eyes Only".

There are two main themes in the novel. The first involves Scaramanga providing the Rastafarians with drugs in return for fires in the sugar plantations, a return of the theme used in "Risico", of drugs being used for political purposes to undermine the West. This was part of a wider conspiracy by Scaramanga and his KGB connection, Hendricks, to destabilise the region by a campaign of industrial sabotage against companies based in Jamaica, including Reynolds Metal, Kaiser Bauxite and Aluminia.

Jeremy Black notes that the independent inquiry at the end of the novel, conducted in Bond's hospital bedroom, was undertaken by the Jamaican judiciary and the CIA and MI6 were recorded as acting "under the closest liaison and direction of the Jamaican CID"; Bond and Leiter are also awarded the Jamaican Police Medal for "Services to the Independent State of Jamaica." Black observes that this was the new world of a non-colonial, independent Jamaica, underlining the collapse of the British Empire.

Background

Ian Fleming wrote The Man with the Golden Gun at his Goldeneye estate in Jamaica in January and February 1964, completing it by the beginning of March. His health affected him badly during the writing process and he dropped from his usual rate of two thousand words a morning to a little over an hour's worth of work a day.

As with his previous novels, Fleming used events from his past as elements in his novel. Whilst at Kitzbühel in the 1930s, Fleming's car, a Standard Tourer, had been struck by a train at a level crossing and he had been dragged fifty yards down the track. From that time on he had associated trains with death, which led to their use as a plot device not just in The Man with the Golden Gun, but also in Live and Let Die, Diamonds Are Forever and From Russia, with Love.

As well as using events from his past, Fleming also used names of individuals he knew for some of his characters. The editor of The London Magazine, Alan Ross, had provided Fleming with details about the effects of the electroshock therapy that Bond went through and, by way of thanks, the novel's SIS station chief in Jamaica, Commander Ross, was named after him. Similarly, Fleming used the name of the secretary of the Royal St George's Golf Club, Mark Nicholson, for the CIA representative at the hotel. Tony Hugill, the sugar planter mentioned in the novel, was named after a member of Fleming's 30 AU unit who managed the Tate & Lyle plantations in the West Indies after the war and the book's main villain, Francisco Scaramanga, was named after George Scaramanga, an Etonian contemporary of Fleming's: the pair are said to have fought at school.

The effects of the two Eon Productions Bond films released prior to the writing of the novel (Dr. No and From Russia with Love) were reflected in the novel through the increased number of gadgets used. One of these was the poison gun used in the scene of the attempted assassination of M. The idea was taken from the story of Bohdan Stashynsky, who defected from the Eastern Bloc to the West in 1961. Stashynsky was put on trial for the murder of Ukrainian nationalist leaders Lev Rebet and Stepan Bandera and stated that he had used a poison-spray gun to do it.

Fleming returned to Britain with a completed first draft of the manuscript in March 1964 and wrote to the copy editor of all his novels, William Plomer, saying it needed a lot of re-writing. As time went on Fleming became increasingly unhappy with the book and thought about re-working it in the spring of 1965, but was persuaded against it by Plomer, who considered the novel viable for publication. Five months after returning from Jamaica, on the morning of 12 August 1964, Fleming died of a heart attack. His obituary in The Times noted that he "had completed and was revising a new novel, The Man with the Golden Gun."

Despite William Plomer's original thought about the state of the manuscript, editors Jonathan Cape were concerned enough about the story to pass the manuscript to Kingsley Amis to read on holiday, paying him £35/15 shillings for his thoughts and advice, although Amis' subsequent suggestions were not used by Cape. Cape had taken the step because they thought the novel was thin and "feeble". Raymond Benson has noted that the thinness comes from a lack of the rich detail and descriptions which are normally present in Fleming's work, but which are missing from The Man with the Golden Gun; Benson suggests that these details were normally worked into the second draft by Fleming, but their absence shows that no such additional work was done on this occasion. The Man with the Golden Gun was published posthumously, eight months after its author's death.

Release and reception

The Man with the Golden Gun was published in the UK on 1 April 1965 by Jonathan Cape, was 221 pages long and cost eighteen shillings. Cover artist Richard Chopping undertook the cover design again and was paid 300 guineas for the artwork. The Man with the Golden Gun was published in the US in August 1965, was 183 pages long and cost $4.50. Even before the US edition was published, The Man with the Golden Gun was ninth place on the best-seller lists, with 80,000 pre-orders for the hardback version.

Reviews
Critics did not praise The Man with the Golden Gun, although much of the criticism was muted. Fleming biographer Henry Chandler noted that the novel "received polite and rather sad reviews, recognizing that the book had effectively been left half-finished, and as such did not represent Fleming at the top of his game." Kingsley Amis wrote in the New Statesman that the book was "a sadly empty tale, empty of the interests and effects that for better or worse, Ian Fleming made his own." Meanwhile, the critic for The Times wrote that the novel would "doubtless be followed with close attention by the keen-eyed admirers of the many-wiled Bond."

Maurice Richardson, writing in The Observer, lamented that "perhaps Ian Fleming was very tired when he wrote it. Perhaps ... he left it unrevised. The fact remains that this posthumous Bond is a sadly sub-standard job." His praise for the novel was muted, admitting "it isn't of course by any means totally unreadable but it's depressingly far from the best Bond." Writing in The Observers sister paper, The Guardian, Christopher Wordsworth noted that "since Goldfinger 007 has been toiling hopelessly in the wake of the Zeitgeist." Prior to this novel, Wordsworth writes, "the distance between Live and let Die, Ian Fleming's second and best, and You Only Live Twice, his last and worst, is a long iron down the Sandwich fairway." The Man with the Golden Gun, however, sinks to the level of a "farrago".

William Trevor, writing in The Listener, was dismissive of the work, thinking that "Bond continues to behave with so little originality that neither Templar nor Drummond, Marlowe nor Nick Charles, would have paused to waste a pellet on him"; he continued, saying that "this present work is once again a fantasy for grown-up children, neither as clever nor exciting as the early thrillers of Edgar Wallace or the boys adventure stories of fifty years ago." Trevor did admit that "for those who like to escape to Bondsville, the old boom-town hasn't changed a scrap."

The critic for Time was damning, saying that "It may have been just as well that Fleming died when everybody still thought he could do no wrong". Meanwhile, the critic for Newsweek said that "James Bond should have had a better exit. Sadly [it] ... ends not with a bang but a whimper. The world will be a vastly more lacklustre and complicated place with 007 gone."

The Associated Press wrote that "Bond and Fleming were fun. They entertained, sometimes mildly, often grandly – but always consistently. Life will be less interesting without them." In his review for The New York Times, Charles Poore wrote that The Man with the Golden Gun was "a gory, glittering saga". Poore noted that "The Gee-whizzery ... starts early and never flags" and that, despite the passing of Fleming, "the James Bond spirit soars on". The critic for Books and Bookmen lamented the fact that "Bond has gone out like a lamb; even the girls are below par, while the villain seems like a refuge from a seedy Western. But we'll miss our James".

D.A.N. Jones, writing in The New York Review of Books, thought The Man with the Golden Gun was "an innocuous run-of-the-mill adventure story of 1911 vintage", Anthony Lejeune, writing in the National Review, thought that it "is undeniably slight, but, like everything Fleming wrote, intensely readable ... In a sense Fleming's job was finished. He had irrevocably transformed the genre in which he worked". Lejeune went on to say that "in highbrow novels sex and violence are treated gloomily: in Fleming's stories they are presented cheerfully with full enjoyment."

Adaptations

Newspaper serialisation (1965)
The Man with the Golden Gun was published in serial form in the Daily Express newspaper on a daily basis from 22 March 1965 onwards.

Playboy serialisation (1965)
This novel was also serialised over four issues of Playboy from April through July 1965.

Comic strip (1966)
The novel was adapted as a daily comic strip which was published in the Daily Express newspaper and syndicated around the world. The adaptation ran from 10 January to 10 September 1966. The adaptation was written by Jim Lawrence and illustrated by Yaroslav Horak. The strip was reprinted by Titan Books in The James Bond Omnibus Vol. 2, published in 2011.

The Man with the Golden Gun (1974)
In 1974, Eon Productions made the ninth Bond film, loosely based on the novel. The film starred Roger Moore as Bond and Fleming's cousin, Christopher Lee, as Scaramanga. The film moved away from Jamaica to the Far East and borrowed from the martial arts genre that was popular in the 1970s. The plot also changed and used the 1973 energy crisis as a backdrop to the film, allowing the MacGuffin of the "Solex agitator" to be introduced.

Licence to Kill (1989)
The antagonist Franz Sanchez ("FS"), and Bond's takedown of his organization from the inside, mirror elements of the novel.

See also

 Outline of James Bond

References

Bibliography

External links
 
 Ian Fleming Bibliography of James Bond 1st Editions

1965 British novels
British novels adapted into films
Cold War spy novels
James Bond books
Jonathan Cape books
Novels by Ian Fleming
Novels published posthumously
Novels set in Jamaica
Novels adapted into radio programs